Crucified Girl (German: Mädchen am Kreuz) is a 1929 German silent drama film directed by Jacob Fleck and Luise Fleck and starring Valerie Boothby, Gertrud de Lalsky and Evelyn Holt. It was shot at the Johannisthal Studios in Berlin. The film's art direction was by Artur Gunther and August Rinaldi.

Cast
In alphabetical order
 Valerie Boothby   
 Gertrud de Lalsky   
 Evelyn Holt   
 Robert Leffler   
 Fritz Odemar   
 Livio Pavanelli   
 Ernő Verebes  
 Wolfgang Zilzer

References

Bibliography
Prawer, S.S. Between Two Worlds: The Jewish Presence in German and Austrian Film, 1910–1933. Berghahn Books, 2005.

External links

1929 films
Films of the Weimar Republic
1929 drama films
German silent feature films
German drama films
Films directed by Jacob Fleck
Films directed by Luise Fleck
German black-and-white films
Silent drama films
1920s German films
Films shot at Johannisthal Studios
1920s German-language films